Kristin Lee Phillips-Hill is a member of the Pennsylvania State Senate, representing the 28th Senate district. Prior to being elected to the Senate, she was a member of the Pennsylvania House of Representatives, representing the 93rd House district in York County, Pennsylvania from 2015 to 2019. Before entering state politics, she was a member of the Dallastown Area School Board from 2011 to 2014.

Born in Camden, New Jersey, she graduated in 1984 from Cinnaminson High School.

Electoral history

References

External links
Official Web Site

Living people
Cinnaminson High School alumni
People from Cinnaminson Township, New Jersey
People from York County, Pennsylvania
Politicians from Camden, New Jersey
Rutgers University alumni
Republican Party Pennsylvania state senators
Republican Party members of the Pennsylvania House of Representatives
Women state legislators in Pennsylvania
21st-century American politicians
21st-century American women politicians
1965 births
School board members in Pennsylvania